Khan Tuman is a village in northern Syria, administratively part of the Mount Simeon District of Aleppo Governorate, located southwest of Aleppo. Nearby localities include Urum al-Kubrah, Urum al-Sughrah, al-Shaykh Ali and al-Zurbah. According to the Syria Central Bureau of Statistics, Khan Tuman had a population of 2,781 in the 2004 census. The village is built on a hill located just east of the Queiq River. It is known for its historical caravanserai which dates back to 1189.

See also 
 Khan Tuman (building)
 Khan Tuman (operation)

References

Bibliography

Populated places in Mount Simeon District